Do the Right Thing is a 1989 American comedy-drama film produced, written, and directed by Spike Lee. It stars Lee, Danny Aiello, Ossie Davis, Ruby Dee, Richard Edson, Giancarlo Esposito, Bill Nunn, John Turturro, and Samuel L. Jackson, and is the feature film debut of Martin Lawrence and Rosie Perez. The story explores a Brooklyn neighborhood's simmering racial tension between its African-American residents and the Italian-American owners of a local pizzeria, culminating in tragedy and violence on a hot summer day.

The film was a critical and commercial success and received numerous accolades, including Academy Award nominations for Best Original Screenplay and Best Supporting Actor for Aiello's portrayal of Sal the pizzeria owner. It is often listed among the greatest films of all time. In 1999, the film was deemed "culturally, historically, or aesthetically significant" by the Library of Congress, and was selected for preservation in the National Film Registry.

Plot

Twenty-five-year-old Mookie lives in Bedford–Stuyvesant with his sister Jade, has a toddler son named Hector with his girlfriend Tina, and works as a delivery man at a local pizzeria that has been owned and operated for 25 years by Sal, an Italian-American who lives in Bensonhurst. Sal's racist eldest son Pino is antagonistic towards Mookie, clashing with both his father, who refuses to move his business out of the majority African-American neighborhood, and his younger brother Vito, who is friendly with Mookie.

Many distinctive residents are introduced, including friendly drunk Da Mayor; Mother Sister, who watches the neighborhood from her brownstone; Radio Raheem, who blasts Public Enemy's "Fight the Power" on his boombox wherever he goes; and Smiley, a mentally disabled man who meanders around the neighborhood trying to sell hand-colored pictures of Malcolm X and Martin Luther King Jr.

At Sal's, Mookie's friend Buggin' Out questions Sal about his "Wall of Fame", decorated with photos of famous Italian-Americans, and demands that Sal put up pictures of Black celebrities since the pizzeria is in a Black neighborhood. Sal replies that it is his business, and that he can have whoever he wants on the wall. Buggin' Out attempts to start boycotting the pizzeria.

During the day, local teenagers open a fire hydrant and douse the other neighbors to beat the heat wave before officers Mark Ponte and Gary Long intervene. After a phone call, Mookie and Pino debate race. Mookie confronts Pino about his contempt towards African-Americans, although Pino's favorite celebrities are Black. Various characters express racial insults: Mookie against Italians, Pino against African-Americans, Latino Stevie against Koreans, White officer Gary Long against Puerto Ricans, and Korean store owner Sonny against Jews. Pino expresses his hatred for African-Americans to Sal, who insists on staying in the neighborhood.

That night, Buggin' Out, Radio Raheem, and Smiley march into Sal's and demand that Sal change the Wall of Fame. Sal demands that Radio Raheem turn his boombox off, but he refuses. Buggin' Out calls Sal and his sons "Guinea bastards" and threatens to shutter the pizzeria until they change the Wall of Fame. An angered Sal calls Buggin' Out a "nigger" and destroys Raheem's boombox with a bat. Raheem attacks Sal, igniting a fight that spills out into the street and attracts a crowd. While Raheem is strangling Sal, the police arrive, including Officer Long and Ponte from earlier in the movie, who break up the fight, and apprehend Raheem and Buggin' Out. As the officers attempt to restrain an enraged Raheem, suddenly Long throws Raheem in a chokehold with his nightstick. Despite the pleas of his partner Ponte and onlookers to stop, Long instead tightens his chokehold on Raheem, killing him. Realizing their error, the officers place his body in the back of a police car and drive off.

The onlookers, devastated and enraged about Radio Raheem's death, blame Sal and his sons. Da Mayor tries to convince the crowd that Sal did not cause his death but the crowd remains stationary. In a brief fit of anger and grief, Mookie grabs a trash can and throws it through the window of Sal's pizzeria, sparking the crowd to rush into and destroy the pizzeria. Smiley sets the building on fire, and Da Mayor pulls Sal and his sons away from the mob, which then turns towards Sonny's store, preparing to destroy it too. However, a panicked Sonny eventually dissuades the group. The police return to the site, along with firemen and riot patrols to extinguish the fire and disperse the crowd. After they issue a warning, the firefighters turn their hoses on the rioters, leading to more fighting and arrests, while Mookie and Jade watch in shock from the curb. Smiley wanders back into the smoldering building and hangs one of his pictures on the remnants of Sal's Wall of Fame.

The next day, after arguing with Tina, Mookie returns to Sal. He feels that Mookie had betrayed him, but Mookie demands his weekly pay. The two men argue and cautiously reconcile, and Sal finally pays Mookie. Local DJ Mister Señor Love Daddy dedicates a song to Radio Raheem.

Before the credits, two quotations expressing different views about violence, one by Martin Luther King and one by Malcolm X, appear, followed by a photograph of both leaders shaking hands.  Lee then dedicates the film to the families of six victims of brutality or racial violence: Eleanor Bumpurs, Michael Griffith, Arthur Miller Jr., Edmund Perry, Yvonne Smallwood, and Michael Stewart.

Cast

 Spike Lee as Mookie
 Danny Aiello as Sal
 Ossie Davis as Da Mayor
 Ruby Dee as Mother Sister
 Giancarlo Esposito as Buggin' Out
 Bill Nunn as Radio Raheem
 John Turturro as Pino
 Richard Edson as Vito
 Roger Guenveur Smith as Smiley
 Rosie Perez as Tina
 Joie Lee as Jade
 Steve White as Ahmad
 Martin Lawrence as Cee
 Leonard L. Thomas as Punchy
 Christa Rivers as Ella
 Robin Harris as Sweet Dick Willie
 Paul Benjamin as ML
 Frankie Faison as Coconut Sid
 Samuel L. Jackson as Mister Señor Love Daddy (credited as Sam Jackson)
 Steve Park as Sonny
 Rick Aiello as Officer Gary Long
 Miguel Sandoval as Officer Mark Ponte
 Luis Antonio Ramos as Stevie
 John Savage as Clifton
 Frank Vincent as Charlie
 Richard Parnell Habersham as Eddie Lovell
 Ginny Yang as Kim
 Nicholas Turturro as Extra (uncredited)

Production
Lee first got the idea for the film after watching the Alfred Hitchcock Presents episode "Shopping for Death," in which the main characters discuss their theory that hot weather increases violent tendencies. He was also inspired by the 1986 Howard Beach racial incident, in which an African-American man was killed; and also the shooting of Eleanor Bumpurs by police. Lee wrote the screenplay in two weeks.

The original script of Do the Right Thing ended with a stronger reconciliation between Mookie and Sal than Lee used in the film. In this version, Sal's comments to Mookie are similar to Da Mayor's earlier comments in the film and hint at some common ground, and perhaps Sal's understanding of why Mookie tried to destroy his restaurant. Lee has not explicitly explained why he changed the ending but his contemporaneous notes compiled in the film's companion book indicate Lisa Jones expressed Sal's reaction as "too nice" as originally written.

Casting
Lee campaigned for Robert De Niro to play Sal the pizzeria owner, but De Niro had to decline due to prior commitments. Aiello eventually played Sal and his son Rick played Gary Long, the police officer who kills Radio Raheem. Roger Guenveur Smith, who was pestering Lee for a role in the film, created the character of Smiley, who was not in the original script.

Four of the cast members were stand-up comedians: Martin Lawrence, Steve Park, Steve White, and Robin Harris. Samuel L. Jackson was chosen for the role of Mister Señor Love Daddy. Jackson later revealed that he spent much of his time on set sleeping as he has no scenes outside. Lee originally wanted Nunn to play the role of Mister Señor Love Daddy, but later recast him as Radio Raheem. The acting couple Ossie Davis and Ruby Dee, who were friends of Lee's father Bill, were cast as Da Mayor and Mother Sister. Perez was cast as Mookie's love interest Tina after Lee saw her dancing at a Los Angeles dance club. Perez decided to take the part because her sister lived four blocks from the set. She had never been in a film before and became upset during the filming of Radio Raheem's death scene.

Filming
The film was shot entirely on Stuyvesant Avenue between Quincy Street and Lexington Avenue in the Bedford–Stuyvesant neighborhood of Brooklyn. Production designer Wynn Thomas altered the street's color scheme, using a great deal of red and orange paint to convey the sense of a heatwave. The Korean grocery store and Sal's pizzeria were built from scratch on two empty lots. The pizzeria was fully functional and the actors cooked pizzas in the ovens. During filming, the neighborhood's crack dealers threatened the film crew for disturbing their business there. Lee hired Fruit of Islam members to provide security.

Reception

Critical reception

Siskel described the film as "a spiritual documentary that shows racial joy, hatred and confusion at every turn", while Ebert lauded it for coming "closer to reflecting the current state of race relations in America than any other movie of our time." Ebert later added the film to his list of The Great Movies. In a retrospective review in 2019, Kambole Campbell of the British magazine Little White Lies noted the film's lasting relevance and called it "a bold expression of love and frustration and care and anger that is so vivid and expressive it feels like it exists in the here and now." New York Times film critic Wesley Morris has called Do the Right Thing his favorite film.

Some critics were less favorable in their reviews. Dave Kehr of the Chicago Tribune gave the film two stars out of four; while calling the film "amiable", he resented it for employing White guilt and "seeing violence as a liberating symbol rather than a debasing reality." Ralph Novak, writing for People, panned the film as incoherent and having an unclear message and no likable characters: "If Lee is saying that racism is profoundly painful, frustrating and confusing, no one will argue. But this film states the case without offering any insight."

On Rotten Tomatoes, the film has a rating of 91%, based on 105 reviews, with an average rating of 9.20/10. The site's critical consensus reads, "Smart, vibrant and urgent without being didactic, Do the Right Thing is one of Spike Lee's most fully realized efforts – and one of the most important films of the 1980s." On Metacritic, the film has a score of 93 out of 100, based on 26 critics, indicating "universal acclaim", and placing it as the 68th-highest film of all-time on the site. According to online film resource They Shoot Pictures, Don't They?, Do the Right Thing is the most acclaimed film of 1989.

Controversies
After release, many reviewers protested its content. Some columnists opined that the film could incite Black audiences to riot. Lee criticized White reviewers in turn for suggesting that Black audiences were incapable of restraining themselves while watching a fictional motion picture. In a 2014 interview, Lee said, "That still bugs the shit out of me," calling the remarks "outrageous, egregious and, I think, racist." He said, "I don't remember people saying people were going to come out of theaters killing people after they watched Arnold Schwarzenegger films."

An open question near the end of the film is whether Mookie "does the right thing" by throwing the garbage can through the window, inciting the riot that destroys Sal's pizzeria. Some critics have interpreted Mookie's action as one that saves Sal's life by redirecting the crowd's anger away from Sal to his property, while others say that it was an "irresponsible encouragement to enact violence". The quotations by two major Black leaders used at the end of the film provide no answers: one advocates nonviolence, the other advocates armed self-defense in response to oppression.

Spike Lee has remarked that only White viewers ask him if Mookie did the right thing; Black viewers do not ask him the question. Lee believes the key point is that Mookie was angry at the wrongful death of Radio Raheem, stating that viewers who question the riot are explicitly failing to see the difference between property damage and the death of a Black man.

Lee has been criticized for his treatment of women in his films. bell hooks said that he wrote Black women in the same objectifying way that White male filmmakers write the characters of White women. Rosie Perez, who made her acting debut as Tina in the film, later said that she was very uncomfortable with doing the nude scene in the film:

In June 2006, Entertainment Weekly magazine placed Do the Right Thing at No. 22 on its list of The 25 Most Controversial Movies Ever.

In the 2021 Cannes Film Festival award ceremony, Chaz Ebert, the wife of the late film critic Roger Ebert, noted that her husband had been appalled that the film had not received any awards from the Cannes jury in 1989, and had even threatened to boycott the festival as a result. Spike Lee noted that the U.S. press at the time thought the film "would start race riots all across America". Drawing a loud applause from attending press, he pointed to the continued relevance of the film's story, more than three decades on, saying:

Awards and nominations

American Film Institute lists
 AFI's 100 Years...100 Songs:
 "Fight the Power" – No. 40
 AFI's 100 Years...100 Movies (10th Anniversary Edition) – No. 96

Home media
Do the Right Thing was released on VHS after its theatrical run, and on DVD by The Criterion Collection on February 20, 2001. It was released on Blu-ray on June 30, 2009, for the 20th anniversary. A special edition Blu-ray with a 4K restoration of the film was released by The Criterion Collection on July 23, 2019, for the film's 30th anniversary.

Soundtrack
The film's score (composed and partially performed by jazz musician Bill Lee, father of Spike Lee) was released in early July 1989 while the soundtrack was released in late June 1989 on Columbia Records and Motown Records, respectively. The soundtrack was successful, reaching the number eleven spot on the Top R&B/Hip-Hop Albums chart, and peaking at sixty-eight on the Billboard 200.

On the Hot R&B/Hip-Hop Singles & Tracks chart, the Perri track "Feel So Good" reached the fifty-first spot, while Public Enemy's "Fight the Power" reached number twenty, and Guy's "My Fantasy" went all the way to the top spot. "My Fantasy" also reached number six on the Hot Dance Music/Maxi-Singles Sales chart, and sixty-two on Billboard's Hot 100. "Fight the Power" also charted high on the Hot Dance Music chart, peaking at number three, and topped the Hot Rap Singles chart.

Track listing

In popular culture
In 1990, the film was parodied in a sketch on In Living Color. Many television series have parodied the trash can scene, including The Critic, The Boondocks and Bob's Burgers.

The scene where Buggin' Out confronts the White Celtics fan about scuffing his Air Jordans is parodied in the music video for the 2008 Nelly song "Stepped on My J'z".

In 2016, Air Jordan released a special Radio Raheem sneaker.

In 2014, the film's 25th anniversary, Barack and Michelle Obama praised the film, and said they went to see it together on their first date. This was later referenced in the 2016 film Southside with You where Barack discusses Mookie's motives with a White colleague after seeing the film.

The "love/hate" speech given by Radio Raheem is an ode to a similar monologue in the thriller film The Night of the Hunter.

Do The Right Thing Way

The section of Stuyvesant Avenue between Quincy Street and Lexington Avenue in the Bedford–Stuyvesant neighborhood of Brooklyn, where the entire film was shot, was renamed Do The Right Thing Way in 2015. The re-naming came from a push by Bed-Stuy’s city council representative Robert Cornegy, Jr. and was included as part of a bill to honor important figures from New York City’s history. The re-naming was meant to occur in 2014, but was delayed through the city’s legislature. The street is the only street in New York City named after a work of fiction, and one of the only streets named after a work of fiction in the world. Lee was reportedly “excited” by the re-naming, and has also begun selling faux street signs for the street on his website.

Related films
Officers Gary Long & Mark Ponte return in Jungle Fever (1991). In Lee's 2006 film, Inside Man, the police provide Sal's pizza to the hostages.

Mookie makes another appearance in the 2012 film Red Hook Summer, where he is shown delivering pizzas. According to Lee, Sal took the insurance money from his burned pizzeria and reopened the restaurant in Red Hook. He then rehired Mookie, agreeing to include Black celebrities on his Wall of Fame.

In the second season of Netflix series She's Gotta Have It, based on the film of the same name, Rosie Perez returns to portray Tina once more and it is revealed that not only is she the mother of Mars Blackmon (Anthony Ramos), but that Mookie is Blackmon's biological father.

See also 
 List of hood films

References

Bibliography
 Aftab, Kaleem. Spike Lee: That's My Story and I'm Sticking to It. England: Faber and Faber Limited, 2005. .
 Spike Lee's Last Word. Documentary on the Criterion Collection DVD of Do the Right Thing. 2000.
 Spike Lee et al. Commentary on the Criterion Collection DVD of Do the Right Thing. 2000.

Further reading

External links

Do the Right Thing essay by David Sterritt at National Film Registry 
Do the Right Thing essay by Daniel Eagan in America's Film Legacy: The Authoritative Guide to the Landmark Movies in the National Film Registry, A&C Black, 2010 , pages 798-800 America's Film Legacy: The Authoritative Guide to the Landmark Movies in the National Film Registry
 
 
 
 
 
 
 Do the Right Thing an essay by Roger Ebert at the Criterion Collection

1989 films
1989 comedy-drama films
1989 independent films
1989 soundtrack albums
1980s hip hop films
40 Acres and a Mule Filmworks films
African-American comedy-drama films
African-American films
American comedy-drama films
American independent films
Columbia Records soundtracks
Film scores
Films about Italian-American culture
Films about race and ethnicity
Films directed by Spike Lee
Films set in Brooklyn
Films shot in New York City
Films with screenplays by Spike Lee
Hood comedy films
Hyperlink films
1980s Italian-language films
Motown soundtracks
1980s Spanish-language films
United States National Film Registry films
Universal Pictures films
1980s English-language films
Hood films
1980s American films